The American Art Association was an art gallery and auction house with sales galleries, established in 1883.

It was first located at 6 East 23rd Street (South Madison Square) in Manhattan, New York City and moved to Madison Ave and 56th St. in 1922. It was the first auction house in the U.S. and had a strong presence in New York during the period of American history known as the Gilded Age, hosting some of the cities major art exhibitions at the time. The galleries and auctions were devoted to paintings by American artists and also had an Oriental Art Department. The aim of the association was to promote American art through a highly visible, cosmopolitan auction venue.

History
The American Art Association (AAA) was founded by James F. Sutton (President of AAA), R. Austin Robertson, and Thomas Kirby (1846–1924) in 1883. Thomas Kirby had grown up in Philadelphia and moved his family to New York in 1876, in the years prior to starting the AAA, he worked at various auction firms and importers in New York. In 1882, Sutton proposed a partnership that would result in the formation of the American Art Association.

During AAA's operation, Sutton, Kirby, Robertson and their staff supervised the sales of hundreds of collections and works of art. R. Austin Robertson traveled to China and Japan to make selections for the Oriental Department. In its first year, AAA exhibited Thomas B. Clarke's collection of American paintings that was a benefit for the National Academy of Design. The AAA held its first auction in 1885.

In 1923, after Kirby retired, Cortlandt F. Bishop (1870–1935), a pioneer aviator and book collector, purchased the American Art Association from Kirby.

In 1929, the Association merged with the Anderson Auction Company to form the American Art Association-Anderson Galleries, Inc, and in 1938, the firm was taken over by Parke-Bernet Galleries, Inc., which had been formed a year earlier.

In 1964, Sotheby's purchased Parke-Bernet, then the largest auctioneer of fine art in the United States.

The Archives of American Art, Smithsonian Institution maintains the bulk of the American Art Association records.  Additional records are found at the Frick Art Reference Library maintains much of the American Art Association records.

Publications
 American Art Association. 1910. A plan and interesting information concerning the American Art Association and the American Art Galleries, New York. New York City: American Art Association.

References

External links
 1877-1924. The Frick Collection/Frick Art Reference Library Archives, American Art Association Records.
 1853-1924. Archives of American Art, Smithsonian Institution American Art Association Records.
 Hundreds of digitized American Art Association auction catalogs available from the Metropolitan Museum of Art Libraries
 Documenting the Gilded Age: New York City Exhibitions at the Turn of the 20th Century (NYARC)
 Digitized Version of "Annual exhibition of the Society of Landscape Painters" catalogue at the American Association art galleries.
 Catalog records for American Art Association related, digitized sales catalogs
 "Gilding the Gilded Age: Interior Decoration Tastes & Trends in New York City" website
 American Art Association Catalogs in Worldcat

Frick Collection
American auction houses
American companies established in 1883
Retail companies established in 1883
Auction houses based in New York City